The blue-naped mousebird (Urocolius macrourus), also formerly called the blue-naped coly (Colius macrourus) is a species of bird found in the wild in the drier regions of East Africa. It is one of the remaining six species of Mousebirds. The term “mousebird” comes from its habit of running along branches in a way that resembles the scurrying of a mouse.

Description
The blue-naped mousebird is a fairly small to medium-sized bird, measuring 13-14 inches in length. Adults have an ash brown, grayish body, crested head with a turquoise nape, and a black-and-red bill, whereas juveniles lack the blue on nape, and have pink facial skin and greenish bills.

Characteristic of mousebirds, the blue-naped mousebird has widely spaced and large feet for its body size, which are pamprodactylous; they are able to rotate all four toes to face forward at will. Their toes are strong and dextrous, allowing the birds to climb and scurry along branches, to hang by a toenail, or to use one foot to hold food.

Distribution and habitat
In the wild, these birds live in the semi-desert and dry regions of eastern Africa They are found in a band between 10°N and 20°N from the western coast to Sudan, Djibouti, Eritrea, Ethiopia and Somalia in the East and south 10°N through East Africa and on to the Eastern Zaire borders.
This species has an extremely large range, and hence does not approach the thresholds for Vulnerable under the range size criterion (Extent of Occurrence <20,000 km2 combined with a declining or fluctuating range size, habitat extent/quality, or population size and a small number of locations or severe fragmentation). Despite the fact that the population trend appears to be decreasing, the decline is not believed to be sufficiently rapid to approach the thresholds for Vulnerable under the population trend criterion (>30% decline over ten years or three generations). The population size has not been quantified, but it is not believed to approach the thresholds for Vulnerable under the population size criterion (<10,000 mature individuals with a continuing decline estimated to be >10% in ten years or three generations, or with a specified population structure). For these reasons the species is evaluated as least concern.

Gallery

References

Dale A. Zimmerman, Birds of Kenya and Northern Tanzania, Princeton University Press, 1999

External links

 Blue-naped mousebird videos, photos & sounds on the Internet Bird Collection
 Another picture and some description

blue-naped mousebird
Birds of the Sahel
Birds of East Africa
blue-naped mousebird
blue-naped mousebird